Dariusz Baranowski (born 22 June 1972) is a former professional racing cyclist from Poland. He is known as individual time trialist and a climbing specialist who excels in competing in the King of the Mountains competitions for stage races. He has competed in all three of the Grand Tours. He also won the Tour de Pologne 1991, 1992 and 1993. He also rode at the 1992 Summer Olympics and the 1996 Summer Olympics.

Major results

1991
 1st, Overall, Tour de Pologne
1992
 1st, Overall, Tour de Pologne
1993
 1st, Overall, Tour de Pologne
1996
 3rd, Rheinland-Pfalz Rundfahrt
1997
 87th, Overall, Tour de France
1998
 12th, Overall, Tour de France
 3rd, Grand Prix Eddy Merckx
1999
 3rd, Stage 9, Volta a Portugal
2000
 30th, Overall, Tour de France
2001
 5th, Stage 13, Vuelta a España
2002
 24th, Overall, Tour de France
 1st, King of the Mountains, Dauphiné Libéré
 1st Overall Grande Prémio Internacional de Ciclismo MR Cortez-Mitsubishi 
1st Stages 3 (ITT) & 4
2003
 12th, Overall, Giro d'Italia
2004
 94th, Overall, Tour de France
 14th, Volta a Catalunya
2005
 19th, Paris-Nice
2008
1st, Pomorski Klasyk

References

External links
Eurosport Biography
Yahoo Sports Biography

1972 births
Living people
Polish male cyclists
Cyclists at the 1996 Summer Olympics
Olympic cyclists of Poland
People from Wałbrzych
Sportspeople from Lower Silesian Voivodeship
Cyclists at the 1992 Summer Olympics